Love Is Strange is a 2014 romantic drama film directed by Ira Sachs. The film had its premiere in the non-Competition programme of the 2014 Sundance Film Festival. The film was also screened in the Panorama section of the 64th Berlin International Film Festival.

Plot
Ben and George, a same-sex couple from Manhattan, get married after 39 years together. George is a Catholic school music teacher, and when word of the marriage reaches the archdiocese, he is fired. Without his salary, the couple can no longer afford their New York apartment and are forced to ask their friends and family for shelter, resulting in their separation. Ben stays in Brooklyn with his nephew Elliot, Elliot's novelist wife Kate, and their teenage son Joey, while George bunks with their (now former) neighbors, a younger same-sex couple of two party-loving NYPD cops, Roberto and Ted.
Still partnered but missing each other, Ben and George find ways to spend time together, as all parties involved deal with the happenstance of an additional person living in a space designed for fewer people. Elliot, Kate, Joey, Roberto and Ted decide how much they want to involve themselves in the lives of Ben and George, and vice versa.

Cast
 John Lithgow as Ben Hull
 Alfred Molina as George Garea
 Marisa Tomei as Kate Hull
 Charlie Tahan as Joey Hull
 Cheyenne Jackson as Ted
 Harriet Sansom Harris as Honey
 Darren Burrows as Elliot Hull
 Christian Coulson as Ian
 John Cullum as Father Raymond
 Adriane Lenox as Principal
 Manny Pérez as Roberto
 Sebastian La Cause as Marco
 Christina Kirk as Mindy

Reception

Critical response
Love Is Strange received universal critical acclaim. The film has a "Certified Fresh" score of 93% on Rotten Tomatoes, based on 176 reviews, with an average rating of 7.73/10. The critical consensus states: "Held aloft by remarkable performances from John Lithgow and Alfred Molina, Love Is Strange serves as a graceful tribute to the beauty of commitment in the face of adversity." The film also has a score of 82 out of 100 on Metacritic, based on 42 reviews, indicating "universal acclaim".

Keith Uhlich of The A.V. Club named Love Is Strange the best film of 2014.

Accolades

References

External links
 
 
 
 

2014 films
2014 romantic drama films
2014 LGBT-related films
2014 independent films
2010s English-language films
American romantic drama films
American LGBT-related films
2010s Russian-language films
Films directed by Ira Sachs
Films set in New York City
Films shot in New York City
LGBT-related romantic drama films
Gay-related films
Sony Pictures Classics films
2010s American films